Marcus Atilius Postumus Bradua was a Roman senator during the later part of the first century. He was suffect consul for the nundinium July-August 80 with Quintus Pompeius Trio as his colleague. He was also governor of Asia in 94/95.

Bradua is commonly believed to be the father of Marcus Atilius Metilius Bradua, suffect consul in 108; if so, his son's name indicates that Bradua married a Metilia.

References 

1st-century Romans
2nd-century Romans
Suffect consuls of Imperial Rome
Roman governors of Asia
Atilii